Montel Samuel Jackson (born April 24, 1992) is an American mixed martial artist, who currently competes in the Bantamweight division in the Ultimate Fighting Championship.

Background 
Jackson started training in wrestling at high school to get away from street life as most of his friends ended up in jail or dead. With good results in wrestling, Jackson set his goal to be an Olympic wrestler; however, he chose to stay back and take care of his sick grandparents and turned down the opportunity to wrestle in college. Jackson  did an invitational wrestling match, Team USA vs. Team Japan and started training in the Olympic training center in Marquette, Michigan. His dream of becoming an Olympics wrestler would not materialize as in February 2013, International Olympic Committee (IOC) members voted to remove wrestling from the Olympic programme. During this time, one of his friends, Devondrick Bankston, was preparing for a fight against Raufeon Stots, and asked him to help on wrestling drills at Red Schafer MMA gym. At the gym, he met Gato, a Puerto Rican, who managed to talk him into competing in a Brazilian jiu-jitsu tournament without a real class instructions. Eventually, Jackson gave up his Olympics dream and transitioned to mixed martial arts.

Mixed martial arts career

Early career 
Jackson started his professional MMA career in 2017 and fought primarily on the regional circuit in the Pacific Northwest United States. He amassed a record of 6–0 before being signed by UFC.

Dana White's Tuesday Night Contender Series 
Jackson faced Rico DiSciullo on June 12, 2018 at Dana White's Contender Series 9. He won the fight via technical knockout on round three.

Ultimate Fighting Championship 
Two month after the win over DiSciullo, Jackson made his promotional debut on 11 day notice, replacing Benito Lopez, on August 4, 2018 against Ricky Simón at UFC 227. He lost the fight by unanimous decision. 

Jackson was originally scheduled to face Brian Kelleher on November 3, 2018 at UFC 230, replacing injured Domingo Pilarte. At the weigh-ins, Kelleher weight at 137 pounds, 1 pound over the bantamweight non-title fight limit of 136.  He was fined 20 percent of his purse, which went to Jackson. On November 3, it was reported that Kelleher withdrew from the bout due to illness and thus the fight was cancelled. The pairing was left intact and rescheduled for December 29, 2018 at UFC 232. At the weigh-ins, Jackson weighed in at 137 lbs, 1 pound over the non-title fight bantamweight limit of 136 lbs. Jackson was fined 20 percent of his purse to Kelleher and the fight proceeded at catchweight. Jackson won the fight via submission in the first round.

Jackson faced Andre Soukhamthath on April 13, 2019 at UFC 236. He won the fight by unanimous decision.

Jackson faced Felipe Colares on January 25, 2020 at UFC Fight Night 166. He won the fight via unanimous decision.

Jackson faced Brett Johns on July 19, 2020 at UFC Fight Night 172. Despite knocking Johns down in the first round, Jackson lost the fight via unanimous decision.

Jackson faced Jesse Strader on March 20, 2021 at UFC on ESPN 21. At the weigh-ins, Strader weighed in at 137.5 pounds, one and a half pounds over the bantamweight non-title fight limit. The bout proceeded at a catchweight and Strader was fined 20% of his individual purse, which went his opponent Jackson. After knocking Strader down twice, Jackson won the bout via TKO in the first round.

Jackson was scheduled to face Danaa Batgerel on September 18, 2021 at UFC Fight Night 192. However, Batgerel was pulled from the event due to visa issues and he was replaced by JP Buys. Jackson won the fight by unanimous decision, setting the record for the most knockdowns in a bout in UFC Bantamweight history with four.

Jackson was scheduled to face Danaa Batgerel on March 26, 2022 at UFC Fight Night 205. However, Jackson had to pull out of the bout and was replaced by Chris Gutiérrez.

Jackson faced Julio Arce on November 12, 2022, at UFC 281. He won the fight via unanimous decision.

Jackson is scheduled to face Rani Yahya on April 22, 2023 at UFC Fight Night 222.

Mixed martial arts record 

|-
|Win
|align=center|12–2
|Julio Arce
|Decision (unanimous)
|UFC 281
| 
|align=center|3
|align=center|5:00
|New York City, New York, United States
|
|-
|Win
|align=center|11–2
|JP Buys
|Decision (unanimous)
|UFC Fight Night: Smith vs. Spann 
|
|align=center|3
|align=center|5:00
|Las Vegas, Nevada, United States
| 
|-
|Win
|align=center|10–2
|Jesse Strader
|TKO (punches)
|UFC on ESPN: Brunson vs. Holland 
|
|align=center|1
|align=center|1:58
|Las Vegas, Nevada, United States
|
|-
|Loss
|align=center|9–2
|Brett Johns
|Decision (unanimous)
|UFC Fight Night: Figueiredo vs. Benavidez 2 
|
|align=center|3
|align=center|5:00
|Abu Dhabi, United Arab Emirates
|
|-
|Win
|align=center|9–1
|Felipe Colares
|Decision (unanimous)
|UFC Fight Night: Blaydes vs. dos Santos 
|
|align=center|3
|align=center|5:00
|Raleigh, North Carolina, United States
|
|-
|Win
|align=center|8–1
|Andre Soukhamthath
|Decision (unanimous)
|UFC 236
|
|align=center|3
|align=center|5:00
|Atlanta, Georgia, United States
|
|-
|Win
|align=center|7–1
|Brian Kelleher
|Submission (D’Arce choke)
|UFC 232
|
|align=center|1
|align=center|1:40
|Inglewood, California, United States
|
|-
|Loss
|align=center|6–1
|Ricky Simón
|Decision (unanimous)
|UFC 227
|
|align=center|3
|align=center|5:00
|Los Angeles, California, United States
|
|-
|Win
|align=center|6–0
|Rico DiSciullo
|TKO (knee and punches)
|Dana White's Contender Series 9
|
|align=center|3
|align=center|2:15
|Las Vegas, Nevada, United States
|
|-
|Win
|align=center|5–0
|Daron McCant
|KO (elbows)
|Driller Promotions: A-Town Throwdown 13
|
|align=center|1
|align=center|0:57
|Austin, Minnesota, United States
|
|-
|Win
|align=center|4–0
|Jesse Wannemacher
|TKO (doctor stoppage)
|Driller Promotions: No Mercy 7
|
|align=center|2
|align=center|3:16
|Mahnomen, Minnesota, United States
|
|-
|Win
|align=center|3–0
|Terrence Almond
|Decision (unanimous)
|KOTC: Mercenaries 2
|
|align=center|3
|align=center|5:00
|Sloan, Iowa, United States
|
|-
|Win
|align=center|2–0
|Sean Huffman
|TKO (punches)
|Pure FC: Pure Fight Night 1
|
|align=center|1
|align=center|1:08
|Milwaukee, Wisconsin, United States
|
|-
|Win
|align=center|1–0
|Josh Wiseman
|TKO (punches)
|Pure FC 7
|
|align=center|1
|align=center|1:44
|Milwaukee, Wisconsin, United States
|
|-

See also 
 List of current UFC fighters
 List of male mixed martial artists

References

External links 
 
 

Living people
1992 births 
Bantamweight mixed martial artists 
Mixed martial artists utilizing wrestling
Mixed martial artists utilizing Brazilian jiu-jitsu
American male mixed martial artists
American practitioners of Brazilian jiu-jitsu
Sportspeople from Milwaukee
Mixed martial artists from Wisconsin
Ultimate Fighting Championship male fighters